Runcinia is a genus of crab spiders that was first described by Eugène Louis Simon in 1875. The former R. elongata is a synonym of Thomisus elongatus.

Species
 it contains 27 species, found mostly in Africa and east Asia, with a few exceptions:
Runcinia acuminata (Thorell, 1881) – Bangladesh to Japan, New Guinea, Australia
Runcinia aethiops (Simon, 1901) – Africa
Runcinia albida (Marx, 1893) – Congo
Runcinia bifrons (Simon, 1895) – India, Sri Lanka, Vietnam
Runcinia carae Dippenaar-Schoeman, 1983 – Botswana, Kenya
Runcinia caudata Schenkel, 1963 – China
Runcinia depressa Simon, 1906 – Africa
Runcinia disticta Thorell, 1891 – Myanmar, Indonesia (Sumatra, Java)
Runcinia dubia Caporiacco, 1940 – Somalia
Runcinia erythrina Jézéquel, 1964 – West, Southern Africa
Runcinia escheri Reimoser, 1934 – India
Runcinia flavida (Simon, 1881) – Spain, Africa
Runcinia ghorpadei Tikader, 1980 – India
Runcinia grammica (C. L. Koch, 1837) (type) – Europa, Middle East to Iran, Russia (Europe to West Siberia), Central Asia, China, Japan. Introduced to St. Helena, South Africa
Runcinia insecta (L. Koch, 1875) – Africa, Asia. Introduced to Australia
Runcinia johnstoni Lessert, 1919 – Africa
Runcinia khandari Gajbe, 2004 – India
Runcinia kinbergi Thorell, 1891 – Myanmar, India (Nicobar Is.), Indonesia (Java)
Runcinia manicata Thorell, 1895 – Myanmar
Runcinia multilineata Roewer, 1961 – Senegal
Runcinia roonwali Tikader, 1965 – India
Runcinia sitadongri Gajbe, 2004 – India
Runcinia soeensis Schenkel, 1944 – Indonesia (West Timor)
Runcinia spinulosa (O. Pickard-Cambridge, 1885) – Pakistan, India
Runcinia tarabayevi Marusik & Logunov, 1990 – Central Asia
Runcinia tropica Simon, 1907 – Africa
Runcinia yogeshi Gajbe & Gajbe, 2001 – India

In synonymy:
R. advecticia (Simon, 1909, T from Plancinus) = Runcinia insecta (L. Koch, 1875)
R. affinis Simon, 1897 = Runcinia insecta (L. Koch, 1875)
R. albostriata Bösenberg & Strand, 1906 = Runcinia insecta (L. Koch, 1875)
R. annamita Simon, 1903 = Runcinia insecta (L. Koch, 1875)
R. cataracta Lawrence, 1927 = Runcinia insecta (L. Koch, 1875)
R. cerina (C. L. Koch, 1845) = Runcinia grammica (C. L. Koch, 1837)
R. chauhani Sen & Basu, 1972 = Runcinia insecta (L. Koch, 1875)
R. cherapunjea (Tikader, 1966, T from Thomisus) = Runcinia insecta (L. Koch, 1875)
R. littorina Lawrence, 1942 = Runcinia flavida (Simon, 1881)
R. proxima Lessert, 1919 = Runcinia flavida (Simon, 1881)
R. proxima Millot, 1941 = Runcinia flavida (Simon, 1881)
R. sangasanga Barrion & Litsinger, 1995 = Runcinia insecta (L. Koch, 1875)
R. sjostedti Lessert, 1919 = Runcinia johnstoni Lessert, 1919

See also
 List of Thomisidae species

References

Araneomorphae genera
Spiders of Africa
Spiders of Asia
Spiders of Australia
Spiders of South America
Thomisidae